2nd Lt. Arthur Clarence Cockeroft (1892 – 1 July 1916) was an English professional rugby league footballer who played in the 1910s. He signed for Wakefield Trinity on the same day as Jonty Parkin.

Cockcroft was employed as a schoolteacher prior to World War I. He was killed on the first day of the Battle of the Somme, while serving with the King's Own Yorkshire Light Infantry.

References

External links
Search for "Cockcroft" at rugbyleagueproject.org

1892 births
1916 deaths
British Army personnel of World War I
British military personnel killed in the Battle of the Somme
Date of birth missing
English rugby league players
King's Own Yorkshire Light Infantry officers
Rugby league centres
Rugby league players from Kingston upon Hull
Rugby league wingers
Wakefield Trinity players
Military personnel from Kingston upon Hull